The Jimboomba Thunder were formed in 2004 and currently field male and female teams in all junior grades of the Gold Coast Rugby League.
The club is based at Jimboomba Park, Jimboomba, Queensland and the Gold Coast Titans Ambassadors are Luke Bailey, Beau Falloon and Cody Nelson.

See also

List of rugby league clubs in Australia

References

External links
Official site

Titans4Tomorrow club profile

Rugby league teams on the Gold Coast, Queensland
Rugby clubs established in 2004
2004 establishments in Australia